Parks in Chicago include open spaces and facilities, developed and managed by the Chicago Park District.  The City of Chicago devotes 8.5% of its total land acreage to parkland, which ranked it 13th among high-density population cities in the United States in 2012. Since the 1830s, the official motto of Chicago has been Urbs in horto, Latin for "City in a garden" for its commitment to parkland. In addition to serving residents, a number of these parks also double as tourist destinations, most notably Lincoln Park, Chicago's largest park, visited by over 20 million people each year, is one of the most visited parks in the United States. Notable architects, artists and landscape architects have contributed to the 570 parks, including Daniel Burnham, Frederick Law Olmsted, Jens Jensen, Dwight Perkins, Frank Gehry, and Lorado Taft.

History
In 1836, a year before Chicago was incorporated, the Board of Canal Commissioners held public auctions for the city's first lots. Foresighted citizens, who wanted the Lake Michigan lakefront kept as public open space, convinced the commissioners to designate two lots as public area. The land east of Michigan Avenue between Madison Street and Park Row (11th Street) was designated "Public Ground—A Common to Remain Forever Open, Clear and Free of Any Buildings, or Other Obstruction, whatever." This lot was soon expanded to Randolph Street, and it was officially named Lake Park in 1847. It was renamed Grant Park in 1901.

As Chicago grew, demand increased for public spaces, but the Chicago Common Council did little to address these requests. Instead, real estate investors realized that small public squares could increase the value of their property. In 1842, Washington Square Park became the first of these ventures, developed by the American Land Company. Similar projects were completed with Goudy Square Park in 1847 and Union Park in 1853. Although the Cook County Court agreed to allocate a major park on the South Side in 1857, these plans were rescinded two years later, and public outcry continued.

Chicago's second large-scale allocation of parkland came in 1860, when a large section of the City Cemetery was re-designated as a park. This was due to concerns led by John Henry Rauch about the possible public health impact of having a large cemetery on the lake. This new park was also named Lake Park; however, due to confusion over its name, it was renamed to Lincoln Park in 1865, in honor of the recently deceased President. Slowly, all of the graves were moved from the cemetery, greatly expanding the park.

Haussmann's renovation of Paris and New York's Greensward Plan in the 1850s and 1860s turned new attention to the role that parks can play in urban development. William Butler Ogden, the first mayor of Chicago, advocated for a state bill to create a large park on the South Side. Although initially rejected when proposed in 1868, the Illinois legislature accepted this plan in 1869. The objective was to create a system of parks and boulevards that would form a circle around Chicago.

In 1891, J. Frank Foster became the superintendent of the south Chicago park system.  He advocated the spreading out of parks into working-class neighborhoods.  These generally smaller parks would nonetheless be filled with playing fields and other facilities particularly 'field house' buildings.  These facilities would provide all manner of recreation space and services to people of the surrounding neighborhoods.  Olmstead's sons, Frederick Law Olmsted Jr. and John Charles Olmsted, designed many of the early neighborhood parks, and these ideas for neighborhood parks influenced national ideas of park design and programming.

Facilities

The Chicago Park District also maintains many special use facilities for activities such as golfing, boating, boxing, skating and baseball, as well as a number of specialty parks devoted entirely to dogs. In addition to maintaining its parks and facilities, the Chicago Park District holds thousands of community, holiday, nature, sports, music, arts, and cultural events and festivals for city residents every year, many featuring performances and workshops provided by nationally recognized "Arts Partners" such as the Chicago Symphony Orchestra and "Arts Partners in Residence" such as the Citywide Symphony Orchestra, the Albany Park Theater Project, Beacon Street Gallery and Theater, Billy Goat Experimental Theatre Company, Chicago Dance Medium, Chicago Moving Company, Chicago Swordplay Guild, Free Street Programs, K-Theory, Kuumba Lynx, The Peace Museum, Pros Arts Studio, the Puerto Rican Arts Alliance, and the Zephyr Dance Company.  The height of these events are during the summer months at the height of the tourist season while children are out of school for summer recess.

Architecture
The dominant theme in many of Chicago's park fieldhouses are variants of either Georgian or Classical Revival architecture. Clarence Hatzfeld designed more of these fieldhouses than any other architect, as well as many of the homes in Chicago's landmark Villa District.

Similar to other areas of Chicago's built environment, a sizeable number of structures in Chicago's Parks are of exceptional architectural value. Portage Park and Jefferson Park are both listed on the National Register of Historic Places, and some like Pulaski Park are official landmarks of the City of Chicago.

Forest preserves
The green-space afforded by Chicago's parks is supplemented by the Cook County Forest Preserves, a separately administered network of open spaces containing forest, prairie, wetland, streams, and lakes, that are set aside as natural areas along the city's periphery.

List of parks

Notable parks
 Burnham Park - ; runs along the Lakefront for much of the South Side connecting Jackson Park with Grant Park
 Calumet Park  - ; shares a border with the State of Indiana, and is also located on the lake. 
 Columbus Park - ; on the far west side of Chicago, considered one of the 150 Great Places in Illinois
 Douglass (Anna and Frederick) Park -  and named after Frederick Douglass and his wife Anna Murray Douglass, it is Southwest of downtown.
 Garfield Park - ; this west side park contains a grand conservatory and lagoon
 Grant Park - ; located in The Loop; Home to Buckingham Fountain, this downtown park is also a favorite site of major festivals including the Taste of Chicago, Chicago Blues Festival, Chicago Jazz Festival, Lollapolooza and others.
 Humboldt Park -  on the west side, was once a cultural center of Chicago's Puerto Rican Community and the site of a famous rally by pianist and statesman Ignace Paderewski that led to Poland regaining its independence after the First World War.
 Jackson Park - ; located on the south side of the city on Lake Michigan, this park is famous for its role in the 1893 World's Columbian Exposition.
 Lincoln Park - ; Chicago's largest city park. Located north of The Loop, this is one of the more distinctive parks in terms of geography, because while it is centrally located in the Lincoln Park community area it spans many different neighborhoods throughout the north side as it is nestled between Lake Shore Drive and Lake Michigan.
 Marquette Park - ; the largest park in southwest Chicago, it has a golf course and many other attractions
 Millennium Park - ; Chicago's newest marquee park, opened in 2004, just north of the Art Institute of Chicago in Grant Park.
 Washington Park - ; located on the south side, it was the proposed location for the 2016 Summer Olympics Stadium.

Arts Partners in Residence
Members of the Arts Partners provide quality cultural content to the parks of Chicago in exchange for the use of space within the park district. These Arts Partners include nationally recognized arts organizations serving park patrons and citizens of the public.
Albany Park Theater Project (Eugene Field Park)
Beacon Street Gallery and Theater (Clarendon Community Center)
Billy Goat Experimental Theatre Company (Broadway Armory)
Chicago Dance Medium (Seward)
Chicago Moving Company (Hamlin)
Chicago Swordplay Guild (Pulaski Park)
Free Street Programs (Pulaski Park)
K-Theory (LaFollette)
Kuumba Lynx (Clarendon Community Center)
Peace Museum (Garfield Park)
Pros Arts Studio (Dvorak Park)
Puerto Rican Arts Alliance (Humboldt Park)
Zephyr Dance Company (Holstein).

Gallery

See also

Chicago beaches

Notes

References

Bibliography
 
 
 
 Rand McNally "Chicago & Cook County StreetFinder", 1996.

External links

 Chicago Park District
 Friends of the Parks

 
Chicago-related lists
Chicago